The 1911 Govan by-election was a Parliamentary by-election held on 22 December 1911. It returned one Member of Parliament (MP)  to the House of Commons of the Parliament of the United Kingdom, elected by the first past the post voting system.

Electoral history

Candidates

Result

Aftermath
A general election was due to take place by the end of 1915. By the autumn of 1914, the following candidates had been adopted to contest that election. Due to the outbreak of war, the election never took place.

McClure was the endorsed candidate of the Coalition Government.

References

 Craig, F. W. S. (1974). British parliamentary election results 1885-1918 (1 ed.). London: Macmillan. 
 Who's Who: www.ukwhoswho.com 
 Debrett's House of Commons 1916

By-elections to the Parliament of the United Kingdom in Glasgow constituencies
Govan
1911 in Scotland
1910s elections in Scotland
1911 elections in the United Kingdom
1910s in Glasgow
December 1911 events